Elong Elong  may refer to:

Jacques Aurelien Elong Elong (born 1985), Cameroonian football player
Elong Elong, New South Wales,  locality in New South Wales, Australia